This is a list of music artists and bands from Mexico, categorized according to musical genre.

Ranchera, Mariachi

Mexican Guaracha, Trival 
3Ball MTY

Mexican Cumbia
Celso Piña
Kumbia Kings
Selena and her Selena y Los Dinos
Banda Machos
El Gran Silencio
Rigo Tovar and his Rigo Tovar y su Costa Azul

Nortec
Nortec Collective

Norteña, Corrido
Los Falcon's
Los Invasores de Nuevo León

Narco-corrido
Los Tucanes de Tijuana
Los Tigres del Norte
Grupo Exterminador
Ramón Ayala
Raza Obrera
Chalino Sánchez

Son Jarocho
Son de Madera

Duranguense, Banda
Ariel Camacho
Tito Torbellino
Alacranes Musical
AK-7
K-Paz De La Sierra
Julión Álvarez
Patrulla 81
Remmy Valenzuela
Luis Coronel
Banda Carnaval

Tecnobanda, Tecnocumbia, Banda Sinaloense
Banda el Recodo
Banda Maguey
Banda MS
Banda Carnaval
Julión Álvarez
La Arrolladora Banda El Limon
Jenni Rivera

Mexican-Spaniard fusion
Rodrigo y Gabriela

Bolero
Los Panchos
Armando Manzanero
Agustín Lara
Óscar Chávez
Los Acosta
María Grever
Álvaro Carrillo
Consuelo Velázquez
José Ángel Espinoza

Merengue
Garibaldi
Grupo Climax (also has made Cumbia songs)

Bachata
Maite Perroni

Nueva canción, Nueva Trova/Protest music
Amparo Ochoa
Fernando Delgadillo

Electronic music
Amduscia
Hocico
Mœnia
Songs for Eleonor

Pop

Rock, Punk
Panda
Maná
Carlos Santana
Molotov
Allison
Chikita Violenta
Big Spin
Nikki Clan
Caifanes
Jaguares
Delux
División Minúscula
Fobia
Le Butcherettes
Rey Pila
Los Claxons
La Gusana Ciega
Botellita de Jerez
El Azote
Volován
La Revolución de Emiliano Zapata
Los Jaigüey
Hello Seahorse!
Arturo Meza
Adrián Terrazas-González (member of the Hispanic American rock progressive band "The Mars Volta")
The Warning
Size

Metal, Hardcore punk
Brujeria
Chingón
Doomsday
Velvet Darkness

Hip hop
Control Machete
Cartel de Santa

Reggae
Antidoping

Ska
Panteón Rococó
Inspector

Jazz
Lila Downs
Magos Herrera
Betsy Pecanins
Eugenio Toussaint

Ballad
Marco Antonio Solís
José José
Emmanuel
Joan Sebastian
Guardianes Del Amor
Los Caminantes
Cuco Sánchez
Grupo Bryndis
Grupo Bronco
Los Baby's
Los Freddy's
Los Temerarios
Verónica Castro
Los Bukis
Los Mismos
Los Dinos
Rio Roma

Latin Lounge
Juan García Esquivel

World music
Radaid

Symphonic bands
Cuarteto Latinoamericano

Classical music

Operas

See also
Regional styles of Mexican music

Mexico
Mexico
Musicians
Artists and bands